Connector enhancer of kinase suppressor of ras 2, also known as CNK homolog protein 2 (CNK2) or maguin (membrane-associated guanylate kinase-interacting protein), is an enzyme that in humans is encoded by the CNKSR2 gene.

Function 

CNKSR2 is a multidomain protein that functions as a scaffold protein to mediate the mitogen-activated protein kinase pathways downstream from Ras. This gene product is induced by vitamin D and inhibits apoptosis in certain cancer cells. It may also play a role in ternary complex assembly of synaptic proteins at the postsynaptic membrane and coupling of signal transduction to membrane/cytoskeletal remodeling.

Mechanism of action 

It is the mammalian homolog of the Drosophila gene Cnk, which is known to bind Raf, and is implicated in ras signalling. It has been show that CNKSR2 is also a Raf binding protein, and is assumed to function in bringing together the Ras signalling complex at the post synaptic density.

It is known to have two isoforms, one of which binds PSD95 and S-SCAM (synaptic scaffolding molecule) through its PDZ domain, and another which does not. Both of the isoforms are, however, known to be synaptically localized, and it is understood that this is mediated by the Pleckstrin homology domain. It's synaptic localization is not known to be affected by NMDA receptor activation. Overexpression of Maguin's C-terminal PDZ domain is known to repress synaptic localization of PSD95. In cultures, MAGUIN colocalizes with PSD95 and synaptophysin at puncta in neurites, and these puncta are first visible at 6DIV.

Proteomic work done on binding partners of Ksr2 suggests that the CNKSR2/KSR2 complex may play a role in mediating crosstalk between the MAPK, Pi3K and insulin pathways. It was found to form a complex with MEK1 (Erk2, p38), MEK2, cdk4, PI3k, the phosphatases PP2A and PP^, and also various translational, ribosomal, transport and structural proteins. It remains to be established how many of these are affected by CNKSR2, and whether this remains true for Ksr2 in the nervous system.

Densin-180 is another important synaptic protein found to interact with CNKSR2. It is known to bind at its C-terminal PDZ domain. In transfected cells, no association could be found between PSD95 and Densin-180 without the presence of CNKSR2. This brings it into a complex with CamKII and β-catenin, and further to the binding partners of CNKSR2 suggest that CNKSR2 may have a role in dendritic branching.

Mutation 
Deletions of this gene on the X-chromosome of males leads to intellectual disability and epileptic seizures.

References

External links

Further reading